Joseph Michael Augustine (March 16, 1911 – January 14, 1995) was a native leader and historian of the Metepenagiag Mi'kmaq Nation. He discovered the Augustine Mound, which bears his name.

Born at Big Cove, Joseph Augustine moved as a youth to the Red Bank Reserve (now known as Metepenagiag), and learned the Mi'kmaq language and many traditions from his father. He was a logger, trapper, basket maker, and ultimately a leader in the Metepenagiag community. He was elected as Chief (1952–54 and 1956–58) and Band Councillor (1960–64 and 1966–72).

He later gained prominence for his discovery of the Augustine Mound and Oxbow National Historic Sites, a trove of artifacts dating back more than 3000 years. For his discovery he was awarded the 1988 Minister's Award for Heritage.

Joseph Augustine was the grandfather of Noah Augustine.

References

1911 births
1995 deaths
20th-century First Nations people
Indigenous leaders in Atlantic Canada
Mi'kmaq people
People from Northumberland County, New Brunswick